Edmund Patrick Twohill (22 October 1915 – 7 October 1989) was a New Zealand actor and radio announcer who worked extensively in Australian film, radio and theatre. He is best known for his role in the classic war film in Forty Thousand Horsemen (1940). After making the film he worked in England for two years, touring in a production of Idiot's Delight, before returning to Australia and working steadily as a radio and newsreel announcer, particularly for Cinesound Productions. He was married to Thora Lumsdaine, a radio actor and the only child of songwriter and radio star, Jack Lumsdaine. They had five children together.

Filmography 
The Avenger (1937)
Forty Thousand Horsemen (1940)

References

External links

Pat Twohill at AusStage
Pat Twohill at National Film and Sound Archive

1915 births
1989 deaths
New Zealand emigrants to Australia
20th-century Australian male actors
20th-century New Zealand male actors